The Longwood Lancers are the intercollegiate athletics teams that represent Longwood University, located in Farmville, Virginia. The University's 14 men’s and women’s teams compete at the National Collegiate Athletic Association (NCAA) Division I level. Since 2012, the Lancers have been a member of the Big South Conference.

In March 2022, the Longwood Lancers men's basketball and women's basketball teams won Big South Tournament titles, punching the first tickets to the NCAA basketball tournament in the school’s Division I history. Only three times in Big South Conference history has the same institution claimed the men's and women's basketball titles in the same year. Both teams also won regular-season titles in the 2021-2022 season, with the men's team in sole possession of first place and the women's team tied for first.

Since joining the Big South, the Longwood softball team has won five Big South tournament crowns and three regular-season titles. The Lancers have appeared in the NCAA Division I softball tournament four times.

The Lancer mascot is Elwood, a horse, and the official logo features a horse’s head atop a lance. The Lancers' fight song is "Hail to Longwood U."

Conference affiliations 
 1972–73 to 1981–82: Association for Intercollegiate Athletics for Women
 1976–77 to 1980–81: NCAA Division III Independent
 1981–82 to 1982–83: NCAA Division II Independent
 1983–84 to 1987–88: Mason–Dixon Conference
 1988–89 to 1994–95: NCAA Division II Independent
 1995–96 to 2002–03: Carolinas–Virginia Athletic Conference
 2003–04: NCAA Division II Independent
 2004–05 to 2011–12: NCAA Division I Independent
 2012–13 to present: Big South Conference

Notes

Championships

Men's Basketball 

Big South Tournament Championships (1): 2022
 Big South Regular Season Championships (1): 2022

Women's Basketball 

Big South Tournament Championships (1): 2022
 Big South Regular Season Championships (1): 2022 (tied for first place)

Softball 

 Big South Tournament Championships (5): 2013, 2015, 2016, 2017, 2019
 Big South Regular Season Championships (3): 2015, 2016, 2019

Baseball 

 Division II South Atlantic Regional Championship (1): 1991

Men's Soccer 

 Atlantic Soccer Conference Tournament Championship (2): 2008, 2011

Women's Lacrosse 

 National Lacrosse Conference Championship (2): 2009, 2010

Women's Golf 

 Division II National Golf Coaches Association National Championships (4): 1987-88, 1990, 1993, 1995

References

External links